Walter Dedaker Shaner (May 24, 1900 – November 13, 1992) was a reserve outfielder in Major League Baseball, playing mainly at left field for three different teams between the  and  seasons. He attended VPI, now known as Virginia Tech.

A native of Lynchburg, Virginia, Shaner spent 13 years in baseball (1920–1932), including parts of four major league seasons with the Cleveland Indians (1923), Boston Red Sox (1926–1927) and Cincinnati Reds (1929). His most productive season came in 1927 for the Red Sox, when he had a .273 batting average in a career-high 122 games.

In a four-season career, Shaner was a .278 hitter (175-for-629) with four home runs and 74 RBI in 207 games, including 80 runs, 45 doubles, eight triples, 13 stolen bases, and a .327 on-base percentage. In 170 fielding appearances, he posted a collective .965 percentage (16 errors in 455 chances). While playing for the 1925 Lincoln Links of the Western League, Shaner finished fourth in the batting race with a .358 average in 122 games, while collecting 230 hits, 85 RBI, 145 runs and 85 extrabases. His 30 triples in that season tied him for second place in minor league history and fifth place in all Organized Baseball.

Following his baseball retirement, Shaner worked as a stage manager at the Stardust Hotel in Las Vegas, Nevada. He was also a World War II veteran. Shaner died at the age of 92 in Las Vegas.

External links

Retrosheet

Major League Baseball left fielders
Cleveland Indians players
Boston Red Sox players
Cincinnati Reds players
Virginia Tech Hokies baseball players
Virginia Tech Hokies football players
Baseball players from Virginia
Sportspeople from Lynchburg, Virginia
American military personnel of World War II
1900 births
1992 deaths
Nashville Vols players